Marion Hall Zinderstein (May 6, 1896 – August 14, 1980) also known by her married name Marion Jessup, was a tennis player from the United States. At the 1924 Paris Olympics, she won a silver medal in the mixed doubles event partnering Vincent Richards.

Career
Marion Zinderstein twice reached the singles finals of the U.S. National Championships. In 1919, she defeated reigning champion Molla Bjurstedt from Norway in the semifinals in straight sets and then lost to compatriot Hazel Hotchkiss Wightman in the final, 1–6, 2–6. A year later, 1920, Bjurstedt avenged the previous year's semifinal defeat and Zinderstein suffered a heavy loss in the final, 3–6, 1–6.

In 1924, she became national singles indoor champion when she defeated the Lillian Scharman, 6–2, 6–3, in the indoor tournament at Brookline, Massachusetts.

In 1976, Jessup was inducted into the Delaware Sports Museum and Hall of Fame.

Personal 
Her parents were Charles Zinderstein (1866-1902) and Elizabeth Schmalz, both children of German immigrants. Her father and grandfather were in the silk milling business in Allentown, Pennsylvania. After her father's death, the family moved to West Newton, Massachusetts in 1912, where they lived on Prince Street. Marion married John Butler Jessup in 1921.

Grand Slam finals

Singles: 2 (2 runners-up)

Doubles: (4 wins, 1 runner-up)

Mixed doubles: 1 (1 win)

References

External links
 
 

1896 births
1980 deaths
American female tennis players
Olympic silver medalists for the United States in tennis
Tennis players at the 1924 Summer Olympics
United States National champions (tennis)
Grand Slam (tennis) champions in women's doubles
Grand Slam (tennis) champions in mixed doubles
Medalists at the 1924 Summer Olympics
20th-century American women